The 2020 Tennessee Democratic presidential primary took place on March 3, 2020, as one of 15 contests scheduled on Super Tuesday in the Democratic Party primaries for the 2020 presidential election, following the South Carolina primary the weekend before. The Tennessee primary was an open primary, with the state awarding 73 delegates towards the 2020 Democratic National Convention, of which 64 were pledged delegates allocated on the basis of the results of the primary.

Former vice president Joe Biden easily decided the primary, winning almost 42% of the vote and 36 delegates and benefitting from overwhelming African-American support, as well as rural support among predominantly white working-class voters. Senator Bernie Sanders took 25 % of the vote gaining 22 delegates, while former mayor Michael Bloomberg reached the threshold with slightly more than 15% but was not allocated any statewide delegates due to his withdrawal the next day. Otherwise Biden would have had 33 delegates, Sanders 20 delegates and Bloomberg 10 delegates. Senator Elizabeth Warren received a single district delegate.

Procedure
Tennessee was one of 14 states and one territory holding primaries on March 3, 2020, also known as "Super Tuesday". Voting was expected to take place throughout the state from 7:00 a.m. until 8:00 p.m. in the parts of the state in the Eastern Time Zone, and from 8:00 a.m. to 7:00 p.m. in parts of the state in the Central Time Zone. Polls closed simultaneously throughout the state, though specific opening times were set by each county, and were allowed to open as late as 9:00 a.m. in some parts of the state. The night before the primary, a line of severe storms swept across Tennessee, with several large tornadoes hitting communities across the state, the worst of which were two tornadoes in the Nashville area that killed an estimated 25 people and caused catastrophic damage, including knocking out power to tens of thousands and destroying numerous homes and businesses. A state of emergency was declared statewide. Some polling places in the hardest hit areas were closed, while others stayed open late.

In the open primary, candidates had to meet a threshold of 15 percent at the congressional district or statewide level in order to be considered viable. The 64 pledged delegates to the 2020 Democratic National Convention were allocated proportionally on the basis of the results of the primary. Of these, between 4 and 7 were allocated to each of the state's 9 congressional districts and another 8 were allocated to party leaders and elected officials (PLEO delegates), in addition to 14 at-large delegates. The Super Tuesday primary as part of Stage I on the primary timetable received no bonus delegates, in order to disperse the primaries between more different date clusters and keep too many states from hoarding on the first shared date or on a March date in general.

Following county conventions on March 7, 2020 which designated delegates to the district conventions, the district conventions were held on March 21, 2020 (via teleconferencing due to the COVID-19 pandemic) and selected national convention district delegates. Afterwards, the state executive committee convened on April 18, 2020 to vote on the 14 at-large and 8 pledged PLEO delegates for the Democratic National Convention. The delegation also included 9 unpledged PLEO delegates: 6 members of the Democratic National Committee, 2 representatives from Congress, and former vice president Al Gore.

Candidates
The following candidates filed and were on the ballot in Tennessee:

Running

Joe Biden
Michael Bloomberg
Tulsi Gabbard
Bernie Sanders
Elizabeth Warren

Withdrawn

Michael Bennet
Cory Booker
Pete Buttigieg
Julian Castro
John Delaney
Amy Klobuchar
Deval Patrick
Tom Steyer
Marianne Williamson
Andrew Yang

There was also an uncommitted option on the ballot.

Polling

Results

Results by county

Notes

References

See also
March 2020 Tennessee tornado outbreak
2020 Tennessee Republican presidential primary

External links
The Green Papers delegate allocation summary

Tennessee Democratic
Democratic primary
2020